The following railroads operate in the U.S. state of Michigan.

Common freight carriers
Adrian and Blissfield Rail Road (ADBF)
Ann Arbor Railroad (AA)
Canadian National Railway (CN) through subsidiaries Grand Trunk Western Railroad (GTW), Sault Ste. Marie Bridge Company (SSAM), and Wisconsin Central Ltd. (WC)
Canadian Pacific Railway (CP) through subsidiary Soo Line Railroad (SOO)
Charlotte Southern Railroad (CHS)
Conrail Shared Assets Operations (CRSH, CSAO)
Coopersville and Marne Railway (CPMY)
CSX Transportation (CSXT)
Delray Connecting Railroad (DC) 
Detroit Connecting Railroad (DCON)
Escanaba and Lake Superior Railroad (ELS)
Grand Elk Railroad (GDLK)
Grand Rapids Eastern Railroad (GR)
Great Lakes Central Railroad (GLC)
Hamilton Northwestern Railroad (HNW)
Huron and Eastern Railway (HESR)
Indiana Northeastern Railroad (IN) 
Indiana and Ohio Railway (IORY)
Jackson and Lansing Railroad (JAIL) 
Lake State Railway (LSRC)
Lake Superior and Ishpeming Railroad (LSI)
Lapeer Industrial Railroad (LIRR)
Marquette Rail, LLC (MQT)
Michigan Shore Railroad (MS)
Michigan Southern Railroad (MSO)
Mid-Michigan Railroad (MMRR)
Mineral Range Railroad (MRA)  
Norfolk Southern Railway (NS)
West Michigan Railroad (WMI)

Private freight carriers
Carmeuse Lime & Limestone
Port Inland Railroad

Passenger carriers

Adrian & Blissfield Railroad (ADBF)
Amtrak (AMTK)
Charlotte Southern Railroad (CHS)
Coopersville and Marne Railway
Detroit People Mover
ExpressTram
Michigan State Trust for Railway Preservation
QLine
Southern Michigan Railroad

Defunct railroads

Passenger carriers
Alanson and Petoskey Railroad
Baltimore and Ohio Railroad (B&O, BO): trackage rights to Detroit for passenger trains only
Boyne Valley Railroad
Western State Normal Railroad

Electric
Adrian Electric Street Railway
Adrian Street Railway
Ann Arbor and Ypsilanti Electric Railway
Ann Arbor and Ypsilanti Street Railway
Bay Cities Consolidated Railway
Benton Harbor and St. Joseph Electric Railway
Citizens' Street Railway (Battle Creek)
Citizens' Street Railway (Kalamazoo)
City Electric Railway (Detroit)
City Electric Railway (Port Huron)
Consolidated Street Railway
Crystal Lake Railway
Detroit Railway
Detroit and Chicago Traction Company
Detroit Citizens' Street Railway
Detroit Electric Railway
Detroit and Flint Railway
Detroit, Fort Wayne and Belle Isle Railway
Detroit, Howell and Lansing Railway
Detroit and Lake St. Clair Railway
Detroit, Lake Shore and Mt. Clemens Railway
Detroit, Mount Clemens and Marine City Railway
Detroit and Northwestern Railway
Detroit, Plymouth and Northville Railway
Detroit and Pontiac Railway
Detroit and Port Huron Shore Line Railway
Detroit and River St. Clair Railway
Detroit, Rochester, Romeo and Lake Orion Railway
Detroit and Toledo Shore Line Railroad
Detroit, Ypsilanti and Ann Arbor Railway
Detroit, Ypsilanti, Ann Arbor and Jackson Railway
Detroit United Railway
Detroit and Utica Railway
Escanaba Electric Street Railway
Grand Haven Street Railway
Grand Rapids Railway
Grand Rapids, Belding and Ionia Railway
Grand Rapids and Chicago Railway
Grand Rapids, Grand Haven and Muskegon Railway
Grand Rapids, Holland and Lake Michigan Rapid Railway
Grand Rapids and Saginaw Railroad
Highland Park Railway
Holland and Lake Michigan Railway
Houghton County Traction Company
Inter-Urban Railway
Jackson and Ann Arbor Railway
Jackson and Battle Creek Traction Company
Jackson Street Railway
Jackson and Suburban Traction Company
Kalamazoo, Gull Lake and Northern Railroad
Lansing City Railway
Lansing City Electric Railway
Lansing, Dexter and Ann Arbor Railway
Lansing, St. Johns and St. Louis Railway
Manistee, Filer City and Eastlake Railway
Marinette Gas, Electric Light and Street Railway
Marquette City and Presque Isle Railway
Menominee Electric Light, Railway and Power Company
Michigan Railroad (MRC)
Michigan Railway
Michigan Traction Company
Michigan United Railways
Mount Clemens and Lake Side Traction Company
Muskegon Railway
Muskegon Street Railway
Muskegon Traction and Lighting Company
Negaunee and Ishpeming Street Railroad
Negaunee and Ishpeming Street Railway and Electric Company
North Detroit Electric Railway
Owosso and Corunna Electric Company
Owosso and Corunna Traction Company
Port Huron, St. Clair and Marine City
Rapid Railroad
Rapid Railway
Saginaw Consolidated Street Railway
Saginaw Suburban Railway
Saginaw Valley Traction Company
St. Joseph and Benton Harbor Street Railway
Saugatuck, Douglass and Lake Shore Railway
South Grand Rapids Street Railway
South Haven and Paw Paw Lake Electric Railway
Southern Michigan Traction Company
Toledo, Adrian and Jackson Railway
Trans-St. Mary's Traction Company
Twin City General Electric Company
Union Street Railway
West Michigan Traction Company
Wyandotte and Detroit River Railway

Miniature railroads

Defunct
Michigan AuSable Valley Railroad

Notes

References

 
Michigan
 
Railroads